8800 series may refer to:

Japanese train types
 Kintetsu 8800 series electric multiple unit
 Meitetsu 8800 series "Panorama DX" electric multiple unit
 Shin-Keisei 8800 series electric multiple unit
 Toei 8800 series tram

Other
 Avaya ERS 8800 Series
 GeForce 8 series